Truly may refer to:

Music
Truly (band), an American rock band
"Truly" (Lionel Richie song), a debut song by Lionel Richie
"Truly" (Delerium song), a second song by Delerium
"Truly", a song by Cigarattes After Sex from the album Cigarettes After Sex (album)
"Truly", an album by Melanie Amaro

Other uses
"Truly", a character from My Little Pony
TRULY, a hard seltzer brand

See also